Tetra Films was a London-based independent production company, trading between 1992 and 2000.

Films and television
Tetra Films was founded by Alan Horrox in 1992, the same year when classic ITV series The Tomorrow People was revived. Prior to this, Alan was a controller of children's programmes at Thames Television.  It produced a wide range of programmes for ITV and Channel 4.
Notable contributions include:

 Cone Zone, Sitcom, Carlton/ITV, 1995-1997 
 Delta Wave, Sci-fi  drama, Meridian/ITV, 1996 
 Mike and Angelo, Sci-fi sitcom, Thames/Carlton for ITV, 1989-2000
 Snap, Comedy-drama, Carlton for ITV, 1997-1999
 Rainbow Toy Shop Series, Pre-school, HTV for ITV, 1994-1995
 Rainbow Days, Pre-school, HTV for ITV, 1996-1997
 The Canterville Ghost, Drama (family feature), Carlton for ITV, 1997
 The Tomorrow People, Sci-fi drama, Thames/Central/Nickelodeon for ITV, 1992-1995
 The Treasure Seekers, Drama (TV Movie), Carlton for ITV, 1996
 Magic with Everything, Drama (adapted novel), ITV, 1998
 What Katy Did, Drama (family feature), Carlton for ITV, 2000

1992 establishments in England
2000 disestablishments in England
Television production companies of the United Kingdom
Mass media companies established in 1992
Mass media companies disestablished in 2000
Former Bertelsmann subsidiaries
RTL Group